Tribune Building may refer to:

New York Tribune Building
Tribune Building (South Bend, Indiana), listed on the National Register of Historic Places in St. Joseph County, Indiana
Tribune Building (Tulsa, Oklahoma), listed on the National Register of Historic Places in Tulsa County, Oklahoma
Tribune Building (Salt Lake City, Utah), listed on the National Register of Historic Places in Salt Lake City, Utah
Tribune Building (Casper, Wyoming), listed on the National Register of Historic Places in Natrona County, Wyoming
Tribune Tower in Chicago, Illinois